Energetik FK is an Azerbaijani football club based in Mingachevir. One of the oldest and popular clubs in Azerbaijan. For a moment it participates at Azerbaijan First Division.

History
The club was established in 1966 and took part in Soviet Second League and Azerbaijan Premier League under the next names like Textilshchik (1966–70), Avtomobilist (1980–87), Kur (1990–93), Kur-Nur (1993–98). The club re-established to the beginning of 2003–04 season and was named Energetik FC belonging Mingachevir HPP.

Last seasons the club takes part in the second level of Azerbaijan championship and can not make good results. In 2004–05 season Energetik promoted to the Premier League but withdrew because of financial problems.

League and domestic cup history

External links 
 Energetik FC at PFL.AZ

Football clubs in Azerbaijan
1966 establishments in Azerbaijan
Defunct football clubs in Azerbaijan
Association football clubs disestablished in 2017
2017 disestablishments in Azerbaijan